Gymnogyps is a genus of New World vultures in the family Cathartidae. There are five known species in the genus, with only one being extant, the California condor.

Fossil species
Gymnogyps amplus was first described by L. H. Miller in 1911 from a broken tarsometatarsus. The species is the only condor species found in the La Brea Tar Pits' Pit 10, which fossils date to "a Holocene radiocarbon age of 9,000 years." The smaller, modern California condor may have evolved from G. amplus.

Gymnogyps howardae was described from the Late Pleistocene (Lujanian) asphalt deposits known as the Talara Tar Seeps, near Talara, northwestern Peru. It lived about 126,000-12,000 years ago.

Gymnogyps kofordi was described based on a right tarsometatarsus.

Gymnogyps varonai is known from fossils found in the late Pleistocene to early Holocene tar seep deposits in Cuba. It may have fed upon carcasses from large mammals such as ground sloths.

References

 
Bird genera
Bird genera with one living species
Taxa named by René Lesson